This Is Jan Howard Country is a studio album by American country music artist Jan Howard. The album was released in October 1967 on Decca Records and was the fourth studio album of her career. The disc featured two singles by Howard that reached the top 40 of the Billboard country songs chart. It was also among Howard's highest-charting studio albums, reaching the top ten of the Billboard country albums chart.

Background and content
Jan Howard was considered among country music's most successful female artists during the sixties decade. Both as a solo artist and as a collaboration with Bill Anderson, she had a series of top ten and top 20 singles. Among her studio albums of the decade was This Is Jan Howard Country.

The disc was recorded in three separate sessions between 1966 and 1967. These sessions were recorded at Bradley's Barn, located in Nashville, Tennessee. The album was produced by Owen Bradley, Howard's collaborator through most of her Decca studio releases. The album featured among the first covers of "Gentle on My Mind". According to the album liner notes, songwriter John Hartford had played the song for Howard's friend, Bill Anderson. He encouraged Howard to record the track. Hartford "reworked the lyrics" for Howard, since it was originally written from the point of view of a man. 

The album consisted of 12 tracks. Six songs appeared on each side of the record. It featured several covers versions of songs recorded by other artists. Among these tracks was Eddy Arnold's "You Don't Know Me", Dolly Parton's "Your Ole Handy Man" and Tammy Wynette's "Your Good Girl's Gonna Go Bad".

Release, chart performance and singles
This Is Jan Howard Country was released in October 1967 via Decca Records. The album was issued in the United States in a vinyl record format. Six songs appeared on each side of the record. On the date listed for January 20, 1968, the album peaked at number 9 on the Billboard Top Country Albums chart. It would become Howard's highest-charting solo album to appear on the country albums list. 

This Is Jan Howard Country also spawned two singles. The lead single was issued in March 1967, "Any Old Way You Do". The song reached a peak of 32 on the Billboard country songs chart. It was Howard's seventh single to reach the top 40. The second single, "Roll Over and Play Dead", was issued in July 1967. It peaked at number 26 on the country songs chart later that year.

Track listing

Chart performance

Release history

References

1967 albums
Jan Howard albums
Albums produced by Owen Bradley
Decca Records albums